Mahlanjuoksuttaja (2005) is an album by the Finnish rock group Absoluuttinen Nollapiste.

Track listing
 "Missä on kaikki mitä rakastan?" (Tommi Liimatta, Aki Lääkkölä) – 7:15
 "Miten tässä vielä käy?" (Liimatta, Lääkkölä) – 2:59
 "Milloin näiden vaikutus lakkaa?" (Liimatta, Lääkkölä) – 5:10
 "Ruukunvalajat" (Liimatta) – 4:35
 "Mikä meitä vaivaa?" (Liimatta, Lääkkölä) – 4:19
 "Nielenkö todisteet?" (Liimatta, Lääkkölä) – 4:09
 "Eksynyt marjastaja" (Liimatta, Lääkkölä) – 4:26
 "Onko meiltä kuulunut meteliä?" (Liimatta, Lääkkölä) – 3:16
 "Aution saaren irtain" (Liimatta, Lääkkölä) – 5:15
 "Mahlanjuoksuttaja" (Liimatta, Lääkkölä) – 7:15

Personnel
 Tommi Liimatta - vocals
 Aki Lääkkölä - guitar, lap steel guitar
 Aake Otsala - bass guitar
 Tomi Krutsin - drums, percussion
 Janne Hast - keyboards, trumpet

External links
  Album entry at band's official website

Absoluuttinen Nollapiste albums
2005 albums